Loughman is a surname. Notable people with the surname include:
Frank Loughman (1892-1972), Irish Fianna Fáil politician
Jane Loughman, British film producer and wife of British-born Canadian actor, David Hewlett 
Mick Loughman, current councillor for the Ancoats and Clayton electoral district, Manchester
Monica Loughman, Irish prima ballerina
Sean Loughman or Jack Lukeman (born 1973), Irish singer/songwriter

See also
Lockman